John Palmer (fl. 1377–1394) of Butleigh, Somerset, was an English politician.

He was a Member (MP) of the Parliament of England for Bath in November 1384. He was MP for Bridgwater in January 1377, 1378, February 1383, October 1383, April 1384, 1385, September 1388, January 1390 and 1394, and for Wells in 1385.

References

Year of birth missing
Year of death missing
English MPs November 1384
Politicians from Somerset
English MPs January 1377
English MPs 1378
English MPs February 1383
English MPs October 1383
English MPs April 1384
English MPs 1385
English MPs September 1388
English MPs January 1390
English MPs 1394